The 2015 Wycombe District Council election took place on 7 May 2015 to elect members of Wycombe District Council in England. This was on the same day as other local elections.

The Conservatives retained control of the council with the Labour Party replacing the Liberal Democrats as the largest opposition party. It also saw the newly formed East Wycombe Independent Party take 3 seats.

Ward Results

Abbey

References

2015 English local elections
May 2015 events in the United Kingdom
2015
2010s in Buckinghamshire